Sergio Asenjo Andrés (born 28 June 1989) is a Spanish professional footballer who plays for Real Valladolid as a goalkeeper.

He started his professional career with Valladolid in 2007, making 47 senior appearances in his first spell. He then moved to Atlético Madrid in 2009 and spent five seasons with the club, during which he was also loaned to Málaga and Villarreal before signing for the latter on a permanent deal in 2014; his career was marred by several knee injuries.

Asenjo was a Spanish international, making a single appearance for the senior side in 2016. He previously represented the nation at various youth levels.

Club career

Valladolid
Born in Palencia, Castile and León, Asenjo started his playing career in the academy of Real Valladolid and soon emerged as one of the most talented players in the club. Succeeding first-team goalkeepers Alberto and Ludovic Butelle, he was promoted to the senior side during the 2007–08 season, and kept a clean sheet in a 2–0 home win over Villarreal CF on 2 December 2007 which marked his La Liga debut. He conceded just once in his first five matches, which earned him a permanent starting berth and saw him rewarded with his first professional contract in January of the following year.

Asenjo subsequently retained his position, but saw 2008–09 be interrupted by a knee injury which ruled him out for a number of matches midway through the campaign. The injury, which sidelined him for a period of three months, was the first of a number of knee ailments which would later plague him during his career.

Asenjo returned to the pitch following his recovery, and ultimately made just short of 50 appearances for the Estadio José Zorrilla-based team before earning a move to Atlético Madrid.

Atlético Madrid
On 8 July 2009, Asenjo transferred to Atlético Madrid for a reported fee of €5 million and signed a four-year deal with the club. He started the season as first choice, but often alternated with compatriot David de Gea.

In May 2010, Asenjo suffered a ruptured anterior cruciate ligament and was ruled out for a further six months. Upon his return, he found his place in the squad uncertain and, in December of that year, he was loaned to Málaga CF until the end of the campaign, with teammate Ignacio Camacho also making the move in a permanent deal.

On 6 February 2011, during a league match between Málaga and Sevilla FC, Asenjo suffered a second ACL injury to his right knee when he turned awkwardly on the pitch surface. He missed the remainder of the season, having only made five league appearances during his loan spell.

Asenjo returned to Atlético for 2011–12 and 2012–13, but served featured primarily as back-up to Thibaut Courtois, who had arrived on loan from Chelsea as a replacement for the departed De Gea.

Villarreal
With his game time limited in Madrid, Asenjo agreed to a one-year loan deal with Villarreal in July 2013 with the club retaining a buyout option at the end of the season. He excelled during his first year, missing only three league matches and keeping nine clean sheets as the side qualified for the play-off round of the UEFA Europa League. The ensuing summer, he signed a permanent five-year contract.

Asenjo retained his starting spot throughout the 2014–15 campaign but, on 29 April 2015, in the dying minutes of a 1–0 loss to former side Atlético, he tore his ACL for a third time while attempting to make a save. After an excruciating rehabilitation process, he made his return to the squad on 23 February 2016 when he was named on the bench by Marcelino García Toral for the Europa League fixture against Italy's S.S.C. Napoli. The following month, and in the same competition, he played his first game in nearly 11 months and kept a clean sheet in a 0–0 draw (2–0 aggregate win) at Bayer 04 Leverkusen.

Asenjo, who reclaimed his starting position following his recovery, signed a new contract in December 2016 to last until 2022. The following 26 February, during the first half of a league home match against Real Madrid, he suffered a ruptured anterior cruciate ligament for a fourth time, this time in his left knee– prior to the misfortune, he had conceded the fewest goals in the league and had kept 11 clean sheets. He spent nine months on the sidelines as a result of the injury, before making his return in November 2017 in a Copa del Rey encounter against SD Ponferradina.

In 2020–21, under new manager Unai Emery, Asenjo retained his place as a starter in the league season, while Gerónimo Rulli was preferred for the victorious Europa League campaign. He made one appearance on the European front, the last-16 second leg at home to FC Dynamo Kyiv which his team won 2–0 on 18 March.

Return to Valladolid
On 7 July 2022, Asenjo returned to Valladolid on a free transfer.

International career
In 2006, Asenjo was selected to the Spain under-17 side as they took home the bronze medal in the UEFA European Championship. He started in all of the matches, except the third-place play-off.

Asenjo was again called up for the 2007 Under-19 European Championship: in the qualification rounds his role in the team was quite insignificant, but his status changed in the semi-final against France, replacing the injured starter and saving two penalties in the shootout as the country progressed to the final, where he appeared against Greece with another excellent display for a 1–0 win.

Asenjo made his under-21 debut in late August 2008, and was first choice at the 2009 European Championships. He also played at the 2009 FIFA U-20 World Cup in Egypt.

In March 2015, Asenjo received his first ever callup to the senior national team, being named in Vicente del Bosque's squad for a UEFA Euro 2016 qualifier against Ukraine and a friendly with the Netherlands. He did not make his debut until 29 May the following year, in a 3–1 friendly victory over Bosnia and Herzegovina at the AFG Arena in St. Gallen, Switzerland; he was the first footballer from Palencia to win a cap since Jesús Landáburu 36 years prior.

Career statistics

Club

International

Honours
Atlético Madrid
Copa del Rey: 2012–13; runner-up 2009–10
UEFA Europa League: 2009–10, 2011–12
UEFA Super Cup: 2012

Villarreal
UEFA Europa League: 2020–21
UEFA Super Cup runner-up: 2021

Spain U17
UEFA European Under-17 Championship third place: 2006

Spain U19
UEFA European Under-19 Championship: 2007

References

External links

1989 births
Living people
People from Palencia
Sportspeople from the Province of Palencia
Spanish footballers
Footballers from Castile and León
Association football goalkeepers
La Liga players
Segunda División B players
Real Valladolid Promesas players
Real Valladolid players
Atlético Madrid footballers
Málaga CF players
Villarreal CF players
UEFA Europa League winning players
Spain youth international footballers
Spain under-21 international footballers
Spain international footballers